The white bellbird (Procnias albus) is a species of bird in the family Cotingidae. The specific epithet is often spelled alba, but albus is correct due to the masculine gender of "Procnias". It is found in forests in the Guianas, with small numbers in Venezuela and the Brazilian state of Pará, as well as Trinidad and Tobago and Panama. As in two other members of Procnias, the males have wattles, fleshy structures akin to the red skin flap that hangs from the throat of roosters.

Description

The male is pure white with a black bill that has a fleshy black wattle, sparsely feathered with white feathers, dangling from its top and hanging down the side, usually the right side; the female is an overall olive colour, with olive streaks on the yellowish underparts, and resembles other bellbirds. The male is unlikely to be mistaken for anything else, but the female resembles the bearded bellbird (Procnias averano); that bird has a dusky olive crown and black streaking on the throat.

According to a study published in 2019, the white bellbird makes the loudest call ever recorded for birds, reaching 125 dB(A) (at equivalent 1m distance). The record was previously held by the screaming piha with 116 dB.

Distribution and habitat 

The range of the white bellbird includes parts of Brazil, French Guiana, Guyana, Suriname, Trinidad and Tobago, and Venezuela. It occurs in moist tropical or subtropical forests.

Behaviour and ecology

Status 
Although the white bellbird is an uncommon bird, its total population is estimated to be large. The population may be in slight decline because of deforestation, but not at a fast enough rate for it to be considered threatened, so the International Union for Conservation of Nature has rated its conservation status as being of "least concern".

References

Further reading
 Snow, D.W. (1982). The Cotingas: Bellbirds, Umbrella birds and their allies. British Museum Press.

External links
 

white bellbird
Birds of the Guianas
Birds of Venezuela
Birds of Brazil
Birds of Trinidad and Tobago
Birds of the Caribbean
white bellbird
Taxa named by Johann Hermann
Taxonomy articles created by Polbot